"La Loto" is a song by Argentine singer Tini, American singer Becky G and Brazilian singer Anitta. It was released on July 6, 2022 by Sony Music Latin and Hollywood Records as the seventh single from Tini's upcoming fourth studio album, Cupido (2023). The song was written by the three singers alongside Elena Rose, while Andrés Torres and Mauricio Rengifo handled composition and production.

Tini collaborated with both artists for the first time, while Gomez and Anitta previously featured on Maluma's "Mala Mía" remix and collaborated on Anitta's "Banana". "La Loto" is a primary modern reggaeton song with urban elements. The song peaked at number six on Billboard Argentina Hot 100, while also reaching number 16 on Billboard's US Latin Digital Song Sales and number 8 on US Latin Pop Airplay.

Background and release
Tini, Becky G and Anitta were part of WhatsApp's “Escuchanos, Miranos” campaign in celebration of Women's History Month. Soon after, rumors started to surface that the three were working on a song together, and in an interview with Billboard, Anitta confirmed and revealed that a “super cool” collaboration with Tini and Gomez was in the works.

In an interview, Tini said about the collaboration: “The truth is that both of them have been great references throughout my musical growth, as women in the industry and as artists, I have to say that I have always dreamt of doing something with one of them. And now having them, together in a song of mine, recording this powerful video – I feel that the truth is, it is a dream come true and I am happy to share this with them.” Gomez also spoke about the collaboration in an Instagram video, saying: “How empowering it is to see three women hustlers coming together for a bop. Anitta swung by and so did Tini, and we were all hanging out and we were talking about girl power. We got to do something together!” [...] We're a force to reckon with now in the music industry. The way I walk into a room, when I see my female counterparts, it's different. Instead of trying to make headlines about who is fighting about what, it's about our record-breaking numbers.”

On June 27, Tini announced via her social media, that a song was coming with the Brazilian and American singers. On July 4, Tini announced the release date of the song with a fragment of the video. On July 6, the song was released, along with its music video on Tini's YouTube channel.

Composition 
"La Loto" was written by Tini, Becky G, Anitta, Elena Rose, Andrés Torres and Mauricio "El Dandee" Rengifo composed and produced the song. The song is written in the key of D♭ major, with a moderately fast tempo of 90 beats per minute. It is a reggaeton song that lasts for a duration of three minutes and ten seconds. The song also has a Latin rhythm, and is described by Tini as exploring more urban nuances rarely heard in her music.

Lyrically, the song revolves around sex, or "sinning" as the girls call it in the chorus, with themes of female empowerment. Tini opens the song by singing about being in a party, saying : "Today we're sweating off all the makeup [...] This now looks like our runway". Anitta takes the second verse: "I fly directly from Miami to Rio [...] I brought Tini, we're gonna make a tremendous mess" before stating "Diamonds shining from head to toe/ The one that's with me won the lotto". Finally, Gomez sings the third verse: "We got all the drip, drip, all of Gucci-cci", and referencing the couple Lele Pons and Guaynaa, followed by "Short dress with nothing under/ This is what I work for". In the chorus, the girls state that they don't care about other people's opinions, and that "Tonight it seems we're sinning/ Tomorrow we go confess". The line "The baby with me won the lotto" expresses female empowerment, with the girls alluding to being the biggest and best prize their partners could have.

Music video 
The music video for "La Loto" was shot in Los Angeles. It was directed by Argentine director Diego Peskins and Venezuelan director Daniel Duran, who have worked with the singers on their previous songs. The music video include the golden, vintage-style. In interview with Rolling Stone, Tini described the video as a “burlesque”-style visual and add: "This video has an aesthetic that is quite vintage, like a burlesque, like Moulin Rouge, as in the old times. The song makes you feel powerful and I think that's what each of us wants to convey on the set.”, while Becky G said: “This video is so 'fire'. The concept, the visuals, the outfits, the hair, the looks, the makeup, it's serving for sure.”

Synopsis 
At the beginning of the music video, we see Tini sitting in front of the mirror doing her makeup. She then starts walking and behind her are shown Becky G and Anitta who are also arranged.  Then we see Tini in a reflective black outfit with golden sunglasses and a pink fur coat walking into a bar. A few dancers come up to her and help her take off her fur coat, while she glamorously walks in the bar, greeting the rest of the dancers. She then finds herself on stage and begins to dance where she is joined by dancers. Then comes Anitta dancing at the bar, and around her we can see dancers and waiters offering her a drink. Then comes Becky G sitting on the sofa surrounded by pearls and jewellery, with masqueraded backup dancers. The thre three Latinas are shown together, decked in an all-gold wardrobe, mirroring each other as they cross their legs in unison, showing off their signature 'badass attitude', and getting glammed up over the reggaetón beat. The trio is also shown dancing on stage, giving us a taste of what winning the lottery must feel like.

Personnel 
Credits adapted from Tidal.

 Tini – lead vocals, songwriter
 Becky G – vocals, songwriter
 Anitta – vocals, songwriter
 Carlos A. Molina – recording engineer
 Tom Norris – mixing engineer, mastering engineer
 Mauricio Rengifo – producer, songwriter, recording engineer, programming
 Elena Rose – songwriter
 Andrés Torres – producer, songwriter, recording engineer, programming

Charts

Year-end charts

Certifications

References

External links

2022 singles
2022 songs
Tini (singer) songs
Becky G songs
Songs written by Becky G
Anitta (singer) songs
Songs written by Anitta (singer)
Songs written by Elena Rose
Songs written by Andrés Torres (producer)
Songs written by Mauricio Rengifo
Song recordings produced by Andrés Torres (producer)
Sony Music Latin singles
Hollywood Records singles
Spanish-language songs
Reggaeton songs